An act relating to revenue cutters and steamers, ch. 78, is an Act of Congress from March 3, 1845, which became the first bill passed after Congress overrode a presidential veto.

The Act stated: "no revenue cutter or revenue steamer shall hereafter be built (excepting such as are now in the course of building and equipment) nor purchased, unless an appropriation be first made, by law, therefor."

References

United States federal appropriations legislation
Acts of the 28th United States Congress